The following is a list of nicknames of national association football teams.

FIFA teams

AFC (Asia)

CAF (Africa)

CONCACAF (North/Central America & Caribbean)

CONMEBOL (South America)

OFC (Oceania)

UEFA (Europe)

Non-FIFA and former teams

See also
 Glossary of association football terms
 List of men's national association football teams
 List of women's national association football teams

Nickname
National